Math Blaster Mystery is a 1989 educational video game within the Blaster Learning System franchise, developed by Davidson & Associates. It was the second title after the original Math Blaster! and available on Apple II, Apple IIGS and Macintosh computers.

In May 1993, the game was added to all 15 IBM-compatible computers at the Intex Corp. Computer Center within the Chinatown Library, in order to help students improve their English and math skills.

Critical reception 
Compute! deemed it a "departure from the rote software that Davidson is best known for". The Baltimore Sun recommended the game for older players. The paper Mathematics Achievement Among Chinese-American and Caucasian-American Fifth and Sixth Grade Girls assessed the educational capabilities of the title, noting that the minigame Follow the Steps was "designed to help develop strategies for solving word problems step by step". Second International Handbook of Mathematics Education noted its uniqueness in framing word problems through context relevant to the overall game narrative, though added that it rarely went beyond elementary arithmetic.

Awards 

|-
! scope="row" | 1990
| Math Blaster Mystery
| Software Publishers Association award for Best Secondary Education Program  
|

References

External links 
 https://journals.sagepub.com/doi/abs/10.1177/107621759001300210?journalCode=gctb (behind paywall)
 https://eric.ed.gov/?id=EJ403015 (behind paywall)

1989 video games
Apple II games
Apple IIGS games
Classic Mac OS games
Children's educational video games
Mathematical education video games
Mystery video games
Video games developed in the United States
Davidson & Associates games